École Secondaire Saint-Laurent is Francophone public and mixed secondary school located in the Saint-Laurent borough in Montreal.

References

External links
 School website (French)
 CSMB website (French)

High schools in Montreal
Saint-Laurent, Quebec